Sherman School may refer to:

 Sherman Elementary School—East Omaha, Nebraska
 Little Rock Central High School (formerly Sherman School (1869–1885))—Little Rock, Arkansas
 Sherman School (Connecticut)—Sherman, Connecticut